The University Centre for Studies In Namibia (TUCSIN) is a tertiary educational institution in Namibia. It is based in the Khomasdal suburb of the capital Windhoek and has campuses in Rehoboth, Rundu and Oshakati.

TUCSIN was co-founded by Beatrice Sandelowsky on 15 June 1978. Since its inception it has trained 35,000 students and awarded over 1,000 bursaries to Namibian students. Andreas Wienecke is its current director.

See also
 Education in Namibia
 List of schools in Namibia

External links
 Homepage of TUCSIN

References

Notes

Further reading
 Bildungsinstitut TUCSIN wird 35 Jahre alt Allgemeine Zeitung, 14 June 2013

Education in Windhoek
1978 establishments in South West Africa
Educational institutions established in 1978